The 2007 Rother District Council election took place on 3 May 2007 to elect members of Rother District Council in East Sussex, England. The whole council was up for election and the Conservative Party stayed in overall control of the council.

Background
At the last election in 2003 the Conservatives retained control of the council with 25 councillors, while the Liberal Democrats had 8, Labour had 3 and there were 2 independents. However, by the time of the 2007 election the Liberal Democrat group had been reduced to 6 councillors, while 2 of the 3 Labour councillors, Helen and Keith Bridger, had left the Labour party in December 2006 and stood at the election as independents. Meanwhile, the Conservative leader of the council Graham Gubby stood down at the election.

Election result
The Conservatives increased their majority on the council after making a net gain of 2 seats to have 28 of the 38 councillors. The Conservatives narrowly defeated Liberal Democrat councillor John Kemp in Crowhurst by 2 votes after 3 recounts, while also taking out the only Labour councillor Samuel Souster in Rye. This meant Rother was one of more than 10 councils in which Labour lost their last presence on the council in the 2007 local elections.

The Liberal Democrats also gained 2 seats to have 8 councillors, after defeating Conservative councillors in Bexhill St Michael's and Battle Town ward. Meanwhile, the independents were reduced from 5 to 2 councillors, with Keith and Helen Bridger being defeated in Bexhill Sidley, while Eric Armstrong lost in Bexhill Old Town.

Following the election Conservative Carl Maynard became the new leader of the council.

Ward results

By-elections between 2007 and 2011

Bexhill Collington
A by-election was held in Bexhill Collington on 12 June 2008 after the death of Conservative councillor Ron Dyason. The seat was held for the Conservatives by Gillian Wheeler with a majority of 677 votes over the Liberal Democrats.

Bexhill Sackville
A by-election was held in Bexhill Sackville on 3 July 2008 after Conservative councillor Keith Standring resigned from the council. The seat was held for the Conservatives by Richard Carroll with a majority of 80 votes over the Liberal Democrats.

References

2007
2007 English local elections
2000s in East Sussex